Osmolindsaea is a genus of ferns in the family Lindsaeaceae. Most species are found in southeastern Asia, from West Himalaya and Sri Lanka to Japan and New Guinea. Osmolindsaea latisquama and Osmolindsaea leptolepida (which may be synonymous) are found in Madagascar and the adjacent African mainland.

Species 
, the Checklist of Ferns and Lycophytes of the World recognized seven species, agreeing with the number in the Pteridophyte Phylogeny Group classification of 2016 (PPG I). , three of these were regarded as synonyms by Plants of the World Online (PoWO).

Phylogeny of Osmolindsaea

Other species include:
Osmolindsaea himalaica (K.U.Kramer) Lehtonen & Christenh.
Osmolindsaea plumula (Ridl.) Lehtonen & Tuomisto [=Osmolindsaea odorata in PoWO]
Osmolindsaea ×yakushimensis Ebihara & Nakato

References

Lindsaeaceae
Fern genera